Across America is a colloquialism for something that reaches the entire continental United States of America.

Music
 Across America (album), a 1997 live album by American singer Art Garfunkel
 Live Across America, a 2002 album by The Rippingtons
 Waltz Across America, a 2000 album by Cowboy Junkies

Events
 Chick-fil-A Kyle Petty Charity Ride Across America, an annual motorcycle ride
 Hands Across America, a benefit event and publicity campaign
 Pledge Across America, the nationally synchronized recitation of the Pledge of Allegiance in schools
 Race Across America, an ultra marathon bicycle race across the US

Other
 Across America, a mission of Solar Impulse in May 2013
 Captain Mike Across America, a 2007 film written, directed and narrated by Michael Moore
 Rails Across America, a railroad simulation game released in late 2001
 Read Across America, an initiative on reading created by the National Education Association
 Spoons Across America, a national non-profit organization
 Voices Across America: A National Town Hall, a live infomercial for Hillary Clinton in 2008

See also
 Coast to Coast (disambiguation)
 Transamerica (disambiguation)
 Trans Am (disambiguation)